Rodrigo Antônio Rodrigues (born 21 April 2000), simply known as Rodrigo Farofa or as Rodrigo, is a Brazilian professional footballer who plays for Spanish club Valencia Mestalla, on loan from Real Madrid. Mainly a forward, he can also play as an attacking midfielder.

Club career

Novorizontino
Born in São Carlos, São Paulo, Rodrigo Farofa is a Grêmio Novorizontino youth graduate. He joined the club in 2015 and was promoted to the under-20 squad ahead of the 2017 season, and impressed during the year's Copa São Paulo de Futebol Júnior. On 25 January of that year, he was promoted to the main squad.

On 29 March 2017, Rodrigo Farofa made his professional debut starting and providing the assist for Henrique's goal in a 3–1 away loss against Santos.

In August 2017, Rodrigo Farofa joined Palmeiras on loan and played at the La Comunidad de Madrid under-17 tournament, scoring five goals in four matches.

Real Madrid
On 13 September 2017, Spanish newspaper Marca announced that Real Madrid had reached an agreement for Rodrigo Farofa. On 30 May 2018, he signed a six-year contract with Real Madrid and joined the U19 team.

Rodrigo Farofa made his debut for Castilla on 13 January 2019, starting in a 0–0 Segunda División B away draw against UD Las Palmas Atlético.

On 24 September 2020, Rodrigo Farofa joined Segunda División B side Talavera on a season-long loan deal.

Career statistics

References

External links
NG Soccer profile 
Real Madrid profile

2000 births
Living people
People from São Carlos
Brazilian footballers
Association football forwards
Grêmio Novorizontino players
Segunda División B players
Real Madrid Castilla footballers
CF Talavera de la Reina players
Brazilian expatriate footballers
Brazilian expatriate sportspeople in Spain
Expatriate footballers in Spain
Primera Federación players
Footballers from São Paulo (state)